Vallabhnagar railway station is a small railway station in Dungarpur district, Rajasthan. Its code is VBN. It serves the village of Vallabhnagar. The station consists of one platform. The platform is not well sheltered. It lacks many facilities including water and sanitation.

References 

Ajmer railway division
Railway stations in Udaipur district